Asif Panjwani ((born : 10 October 1986) is an Indian Composer, music director, singer and lyricist. 
Asif Panjwani has also composed music for many TV serials and music albums including Fear Files, Yaaron Ka Tashan, Pyar Tune Kya Kiya, Savitri Devi College & Hospital and Dil Dhoondta Hai.

Early life and education
Asif Panjwani was born in Mumbai, Maharashtra to a financial humble family and later completed his education from University of Mumbai. Panjwani had started his career as a music operator with Neeraj Vora with the Gujarati play Putri Devo Bhava, in 2007.

Career
Asif Panjwani, the Gujarati Boy from Bhuj had started his career as a music operator with Neeraj Vora with the Gujarati play 'Putri Devo Bhava' way back in 2007. Asif has composed for many singles with Zee Music Company, like Hum Zubaan Ho Tum, Rah Ka Teri Musafir Hoon and more.

Movies & Television Series
Asif Panjwani has also played for music scores in the Indian Film and Indian Television Industry.

 Fear Files
 Yaaron Ka Tashan
 Pyar Tune Kya Kiya
 Savitri Devi College & Hospital 
 Dil Dhoondta Hai
 De Goli 
 Rah Ka Teri Musafir Hoon
 Gujju Rocks
 Terror Strikes Beyond Boundaries
 Kumite 1 League
 Shikve Hazaar

References

External links
 

1986 births
Living people
Musicians from Mumbai
Hindi film score composers